Jan Bystroń (13 June 1860 in Datynie Dolne – 30 June 1902 in Kraków) was a Polish linguist.

Life
Bystroń specialized in the dialects of Cieszyn Silesia.

He graduated from Polish elementary school in Błędowice Dolne, gymnasium in Teschen (1881) and Jagiellonian University in Kraków (1886).

He was the father of the noted sociologist, Jan Stanisław Bystroń.

Works
 Rok 1863 w literaturze niemieckiej (1883)
 O mowie polskiej w dorzeczu Stonawki i Łucyny w Księstwie Cieszyńskim (1885)
 Rozbiór porównawczy znanych dotąd najdawniejszych tekstów Modlitwy Pańskiej, Pozdrowienia Anielskiego, Składu Apostolskiego i Dziesięciorga Przykazań (1885)
 Przyczynek do historyi języka polskiego z początku XV wieku. Na podstawie zapisków sądowych w księdze ziemi czerskiej (1887)
 Lessings Epigramme und seine Arbeiten zur Theorie des Epigramms (1889)
 O szyku wyrazów w języku polskim (1892)
 Drobne przyczynki do składni polskiej z uwględnieniem składni języków klasycznych (1893)
 O języku Baltazara Opecia w dziele "Żywot Jezu Krysta" (1893)
 O użyciu genetivu w języku polskim (1893)
 Przyczynek do bibljografii litewskiej (1893)

See also
 List of Poles

External links
 O mowie polskiej w dorzeczu Stonawki i Łucyny w Księstwie Cieszyńskim online at Książnica Cieszyńska Library

1860 births
1902 deaths
People from Havířov
People from Austrian Silesia
Polish people from Zaolzie
Linguists from Poland
Jagiellonian University alumni